Bribir is the name of two villages in Croatia:

 Bribir, Primorje-Gorski Kotar County
 Bribir, Šibenik-Knin County
 Bribir is used as a reference to the historic seat of the House of Šubić